Robert Joseph Terlecki (born February 14, 1945) is a former Major League Baseball player. Terlecki pitched in 9 games for the Philadelphia Phillies in the 1972 season. He had a 0–0 record in 13 innings, with a 4.73 ERA.

Terlecki attended Notre Dame High School and was signed by the Chicago Cubs as an amateur free agent in 1964.

References

External links

Philadelphia Phillies players
Raleigh-Durham Phillies players
1945 births
Baseball players from Trenton, New Jersey
Notre Dame High School (New Jersey) alumni
Sportspeople from Mercer County, New Jersey
Living people